Elham Al Qasim (born July 1982, in Dubai) is an Emirati woman, who embarked on a successful skiing expedition to the North Pole “unsupported and unassisted” (two terms used in polar expeditions, denoting use of natural means and without any kind of assistance). On April 23, 2010, she became the first Arab woman and the first female UAE national to reach the North Pole.

Degrees
Degree in Business and Marketing at the American University in Dubai in 2004
MSc in Management of NGOs from London School of Economics

Training
Before embarking on the journey, Elham went through an intensive workout to build up her mental and physical strength and develop the required stamina. The training program was laid down by Lomax with the main objective being an overall improvement in her strength, agility, and speed.

References

Personal
In December 2011 Elham married successful entrepreneur Joshua Hannan (Australian)

External links
Elham's Website

Explorers of Antarctica
Emirati explorers
Emirati female cross-country skiers
Alumni of the London School of Economics
People from Dubai
Female polar explorers
Living people
1982 births
American University in Dubai alumni